This is a list of players that participated in the men's wheelchair basketball competition at the 2016 Summer Paralympics.

Group A













Group B

The following is the Algeria roster in the men's wheelchair basketball tournament of the 2016 Summer Paralympics.











References

Men's team rosters
2016